Mehmed Nuri Dersimi (1893 in Akzunik in Dersim (today Tunceli) – 22 August 1973 in Aleppo), also known as Baytar Nuri, was a Kurdish writer, revolutionary and intellectual.

Dersimi was born in March 1893 in the village Akzunik to the west of Hozat, in the Sanjak Dersim. From 1899 he went to primary school in Hozat. After he was sent to the military academy in Elazığ, but he wasn't happy there and asked to come back to his family. So his father decided to move with his family to Harput in 1905, where Dersimi studied in the secondary school. There Dersimi was more comfortable. In 1907 the family moved again to Hozat, where Dersimi could stay with his uncle and visit the local boarding school. 1911 he traveled over Trabzon per ship to Istanbul and began to study veterinary medicine. There he became a member of the Kurdish student society Hevi-Kürt Talebe Cemiyeti and 1912 he became the secretary of the Kürdistan Muhibban Cemiyeti.

During World War I, he worked as a military veterinarian in Erzincan. In Erzincan he was a witness of the massacres perpetrated on the Armenians. Because of his political activities, in 1916 he was sent to Kangal, in Sivas, where he married his wife Selvi.1917 he returned to Istanbul to finish his studies.

From 1919 to 1921 the Kocgiri rebellion took place, which he was supporting. He opposed the findings of Abdulkadir Ubeydullah and preferred independence to autonomy for the Kurds. In October 1920, he departed from Istanbul and travelled to the region of the Kocgiri tribe in the Erzincan province, where he established several offices for the Society for the Rise of Kurdistan. But already in 1919, Mustafa Kemal Atatürk became aware of Dersimis activities and offered him and Alisan, another prominent member of the Kocgiri tribe to be a candidate for the Grand National Assembly of Turkey, an offer they both refused to accept. After the suppression of the Kocgiri rebellion, Mustafa Kemal accused Dersimi to be responsible for the uprising and excluded him an amnesty for the rebels. Following, Dersimi hid with Seyit Riza and taught people to write Kurdish in Latin letters and was a well perceived notable amongst the Kurdish community. In 1931 the Turkish Government pardoned Dersimi and gave him a farm in Holvenk. But the Turkish authorities still kept searching his house and friends then visited seldom and his situation became more difficult. Following a visit to Ankara, during which he demanded to be provided with a new home in the west of the country, a request which was denied, and after he was summoned by the military commander Abdullah Aldoğan of the Fourth Inspectorate-General in the Dersim region, he became aware, he couldn't stay in Turkey longer.

In summer 1937 he decided to flee first to Greece, after to Syria which at the time was under French Mandate. On the 11 September 1937 he crossed into Syria.

He had adopted several children in Syria, one of whom he named after Seyid Riza. His son Seyid Riza had a son as well who was named after his grandfather, Nuri Dersimi.

Publications 
Kurdistan Tarihinde Dersim, (Turkish) Köln, 1988, 

Hatıratım, (Turkish) Dam Yayinlari,

References 

1893 births
1973 deaths
People from Tunceli
Kurdish politicians
Kurdish writers
Kurdish rebels
Turkish Kurdish people